Cond may refer to:

 Condition number, in numerical analysis
 cond, a conditional expression in LISP
 Cond, a variant spelling of conn, to control a ship's movements at sea.